Seychellaxis souleyetianus is a species of land snail, a terrestrial pulmonate gastropod mollusk in the family Streptaxidae.

Distribution 
Seychellaxis souleyetianus is endemic to the Seychelles.

References

Streptaxidae
Gastropods described in 1841